"Promises, Promises" is the second single released by the American alternative rock band, Incubus from their seventh studio album, If Not Now, When? The single was released in 2011.

Song meaning
According to Incubus lead vocalist, Brandon Boyd: "Promises, Promises, is a story about a girl and a guy — go figure — and the girl has built up so much armor around herself with the things that she knows how to do...And so, I used these metaphors in the song of, like, magic, like she's an illusionist, so she creates these illusions around her...And she's gotten so good at it that she meets somebody who potentially could be someone that could help her break through those illusions and those walls, she can't really recognize that he could be the real thing, or they could be the real thing, so she's asking him for one thing: 'Don't make me any promises."

Track listing
Promotional Single
 "Promises, Promises" (Album Version)

7" Single 
 "Promises, Promises" (Album Version)
 "Rebel Girls"

Chart performance
"Promises, Promises" peaked at No. 13 on the Billboard Alternative Songs chart and No. 24 on the Billboard Rock Songs chart.

References

2011 singles
Incubus (band) songs
Songs written by Brandon Boyd
Songs written by Mike Einziger
Songs written by Ben Kenney
Songs written by Chris Kilmore
Songs written by José Pasillas